Emilio Kosterlitzky (Russian: Эмилио Костерлицкий; 16 November 1853 – 2 March 1928) was a Russian-born Mexican colonel during the Mexican Revolution. He had also served in the Mexican Apache Wars and Yaqui Wars. He is most noted for being the commander of the Mexican Rurales, or border police, during the late Nineteenth Century.

Biography
Emil Kosterlitzky was born on November 16, 1853  in Moscow, to a German mother and Russian Cossack father. He was noted for his language ability; he spoke Russian, Polish, Spanish, French, Italian, English, German, Danish, and Swedish.

In his teens, Emil joined the Russian Navy as a midshipman. By 1871, at the age of 18, he deserted his ship in Venezuela. Kosterlitzky then traveled to the Mexican state of Sonora,  where he changed his name to Emilio and joined the Mexican Army.

Conflicts and wars

Mexican Apache Wars 
During the 1880s he fought in the Mexican Apache Wars. He also assisted American troops pursuing Apaches across the border under the 1882 United States–Mexico reciprocal border crossing treaty. Kosterlitzky became known to the American troops, who called him the "Mexican Cossack". In 1885, Kosterlitzky was appointed commander of the Gendarmería Fiscal, the customs guard for the Mexican government, by President Porfirio Díaz.

Yaqui Wars and Nogales Uprising 
In March 1896, the United States Government had arrested Lauro Aguirre and Flores Chapa, who were both revolutionary insurgents, for being accused of engaging in revolutionary actions since they had established an anti-Díaz newspaper that claimed Porfirio Díaz, the Mexican president, had violated the Constitution of 1857. It was later concluded that both men were innocent. The plan was signed by twenty-three other people, including Aguirre, and another man named Tomas Urrea, the father of revolutionary Teresa Urrea. Teresa Urrea was suspected to be a mastermind since he had many close relationships with the people involved in an uprising. Around sixty Yaqui, Pima, and Mexican Revolutionaries united in a rebel band called ''Teresitas'' to participate in a raid.

on August 12, the Teresitas had attacked. Kosterlitzky, who was in charge of many Mexican soldiers, had chased the Teresitas out of Nogales with the help of the 24th Infantry Regiment, under Brigadier General Frank Wheaton. Sources claimed that around 7 Mexican soldiers were killed, while the Teresitas had suffered equivalent casualties.

Mexican Revolution

Costa Oeste Campaign 

In 1910, Kosterlitzky had clashed forces with Emil Lewis Holmdahl, who was an American mercenary. Holmdahl had previously work for Díaz as a captain in the rurales, which Kosterlitzky was in command of, as a security guard for the American railway operating near Mazatlán. He had repelled a raid in late October of the same year. Holmdahl had defected from the government forces to create his own faction. Throughout most of January, 1911, Holmdahl, along side an unknown number of men, had captured small towns and villages including a majority of Nayarit near the West coast. He had plans to capture Tepic, but failed after his men had betrayed him and was lure to an ambush. Kosterlitzky had ended up executing 300 of his men.

Nogales 
In 1913, Kosterlitzky was commanding a force of 400 men in Northern Mexico to help stop actions of Venustian Carranza and Pancho Villa during the Mexican Revolution. On March 13, around 2,000 rebel forces, under General Alvaro Obregon, had attacked Kosterlitzky, and his 400 soldiers. Fighting only lasted for a few hours up until he was eventually captured in Nogales, Sonora, by the revolutionaries. His remaining soldiers had retreated to the border and surrendered to the American garrison of Nogales, Arizona. He was jailed until 1914, when he, his wife, Francisca, and two daughters moved to Los Angeles, California.

Later life and death 
After Kosterlitzky had moved to Los Angeles with his family, he became a translator for the U.S. Postal Service. During World War I, he pretended to be a German physician. Later in 1917, he was appointed as a special employee within the FBI. On May 1, 1922, he was appointed a Bureau special agent. Because of his unique qualifications he was assigned to work border cases and to conduct liaison with various Mexican informants and officials. He resigned from the FBI on September 4, 1926. He returned to Mexico in 1927, to investigate a plot against the government of the state of Baja California.

Kosterlitzky died in Los Angeles on March 2, 1928, and is buried in Calvary Cemetery in East Los Angeles.

See also
Kelvin Grade Massacre
Yaqui Wars
Yaqui Uprising
Battle of Mazocoba
Tiburon Island Tragedy
Cananea strike
Arizona Rangers

References 

 Samuel Truett, "Transnational Warrior: Emilio Kosterlitzky and the Transformation of the U.S.-Mexico Borderlands", in Continental Crossroads: Remapping U.S.-Mexico Borderlands History, ed. Durham: Duke University Press, 2004, p. 241-70.
 Cornelius Smith, Jr., Emilio Kosterlitzky, Eagle of Sonora (1970)

External links 
 FBI General Estrada
 The Situation in Mexico
 Emil Kosterlitzky, the Mailed Fist of Diaz
 Emilio Kosterkitzky at Find-a-Grave

1853 births
1928 deaths
Burials at Calvary Cemetery (Los Angeles)
Emigrants from the Russian Empire to Mexico
Genocide perpetrators
Mexican emigrants to the United States
Military personnel from Moscow
People of the Mexican Revolution
Russian mercenaries
Russian people of German descent
Russian spies
Yaqui Wars